The Casa Grande Dispatch is an American newspaper published Tuesdays, Thursdays and Saturdays in Casa Grande, Arizona. Circulated in Casa Grande and surrounding areas, it is Pinal County's largest paid circulation newspaper. It has been published under the current ownership, Casa Grande Valley Newspapers Inc. since 1963, and in January 2012 it began its 100th consecutive year of publication.

History

The Times
Casa Grande was without a newspaper for most of its 33 years before the Casa Grande Times appeared in January 1912, founded by J. F. Brown, who was also its first editor.  It was not the earliest paper, but it was the first to endure.

Showing an interest in an issue still important in the desert, the Times supported formation of an irrigation district. The paper was printed in Tucson. It was not until July 1913 that an editor's name appeared on the masthead, Bunny Randall. The next month it changed, apparently becoming more formal: Wainwright Randall.

The Bulletin
The next year, a joint venture founded the Casa Grande Bulletin. The first issue was printed on a Washington hand press in Casa Grande in September 1913.

Angela Hutchinson Hammer was a divorced mother of three who had supported her family printing and publishing. She had a successful paper, the Miner, in Wickenburg, before deciding to take a break from the heated political climate there. She opened a print shop in Phoenix with the help of her teenage sons, Louis and Billy.

She was approached there by Ted Healey, a Cochise County newspaperman who had the idea of a paper for Casa Grande but needed a printer. An agreement was made, but problems occurred from the start: She had to pay the freight charges for shipping her equipment because Healey could not, even though he had agreed to do so. Nevertheless, the Bulletin, named after a paper Healey had in Cochise County, went into publication.

The partners quarreled frequently. Hammer was a Democrat and Healey a Republican. A bigger division was that he favored pumping of groundwater while she supported a water users group that wanted to use Gila River water for farming. An editorial she wrote about the water issue was hidden by Healey, but recovered and printed.

The Dispatch
After further problems, Hammer split up the partnership, moved her printing equipment and began publishing the Casa Grande Valley Dispatch in January 1914. Her equipment first was set up on an open lot, then moved inside a warehouse with no front. The Times merged with the Dispatch soon after the latter's founding.

A battle between the Dispatch and the Bulletin ensued. Hammer later bought the Bulletin, but a lender foreclosed on her equipment, an event that may have been hoped for by her opponents. She persevered, having her paper printed in Phoenix for a while.

Hammer leased the paper out for a short while during World War I. She took it back and kept it going despite difficult times economically. The paper became more prosperous in the early 1920s. In 1924 she sold it to Florence publisher A.C. Wrenn, whose son Harold took over the Dispatch.

Merger
In 1928 Healey sold the Bulletin to his former competitor, and in 1929 the combined paper's name was changed to its present one, Casa Grande Dispatch. Ownership, however, changed several times through the early 1960s. Donovan M. Kramer Sr. and his wife, Ruth, bought the paper in late 1962 from Western Newspapers Inc. of Yuma.

The Dispatch then was a small weekly newspaper and was published in the building that now houses the Casa Grande Steakhouse, on Second Street near Florence Street. The Kramers soon converted to the offset printing process with cold type and moved the office up the street to 200 West Second Street, formerly the home of the post office, and to another building immediately to the west. Other buildings were purchased over the years in that block.

Frequency changes
The Dispatch in 1963 began publishing twice a week, and it became a member of the Associated Press in 1967. A third edition was added on Fridays in 1971. Five-day-a-week publication began in 1974, and a Saturday morning edition started in 1976. Later the Dispatch ended its Monday edition in favor of a Sunday edition and at that time the paper was changed from afternoon to morning delivery. In June 2019 the Dispatch began publishing three days per week — Tuesdays, Thursdays and Saturdays — with news and content published daily on its website, PinalCentral.com

Sister newspapers
The Kramers bought the weekly Eloy Enterprise in 1967 and the Florence Reminder in 1970. They merged the Reminder with the Florence Blade-Tribune when it was bought the next year along with the Coolidge Examiner.

Casa Grande Valley Newspapers Inc. now also publishes the weekly Arizona City Independent (in consolidation with the Arizona City Edition) and Maricopa Monitor. The company also publishes a shopper, Central Saver, and Pinal Ways magazine, Pinal Real Estate Buyers' Guide, Arizona Autos. The Kramer family also owns the White Mountain Independent, covering Show Low, Pinetop-Lakeside, Springerville, St. Johns and Snowflake. and the  Payson Roundup covering Payson, Pine, Strawberry, Rye and Tonto Basin.

External links
Casa Grande Dispatch website

References

Newspapers published in Arizona
Mass media in Pinal County, Arizona
Newspapers established in 1912
Casa Grande, Arizona
1912 establishments in Arizona